Nothing Left to Lose is a 2017 horror novel by Dan Wells published by Tor Books. It is the sixth and final installment of the John Wayne Cleaver series, following Over Your Dead Body (2016). The novel concludes the story of sociopathic teenage protagonist John Cleaver and his hunt of an ancient network of demons who call themselves "the Withered." After bringing his best friend Brooke back to her home and family, John travels to Arizona to find Rain, the Queen of the Withered. In what appears to be a simple, small town, John has to face multiple demons, all while trying to hide from the FBI. Critical reception of Nothing Left to Lose was mostly positive, and the book was nominated for both an AML Award and a Dragon Award. It has been published in English, Spanish, and German. The audiobook version is narrated by Kirby Heyborne.

Development 
Like the earlier books in the series, Nothing Left to Lose required research on Wells's part of embalming and other aspects of a mortuary. He also drew upon his experiences traveling to Germany to write about John's travels in the second trilogy of the series. Wells wanted to write the novel in such a way that new readers not familiar with John or his past would be able to understand the events that occur in this sixth book. He asserted in an episode of the podcast Writing Excuses that Nothing Left to Lose would be the last book in the John Cleaver series. He has, however, mentioned the possibility of releasing short stories "about some of [John's] travels the books only hint at."

Plot summary 
John Wayne Cleaver is again flying solo on his vendetta against the supernatural killers called "the Withered." He follows a lead to the town of Lewisville, Arizona in search of a demon named "Rain." His first stop is the funeral of a woman he suspects might be a victim of a Withered. There, he is approached by an odd, homeless-looking woman who tells him to "Run from Rain." He lands a job as the local mortuary's make-up artist and makes friends with his boss, Margo, and fellow employee, Jasmyn. When townspeople begin to die under strange circumstances, John's gig allows him to examine the bodies of the victims: a woman who drowned nowhere near water, and a boy who was burned alive nowhere near fire.  Then, while walking by the local canal, John is almost drowned by a man who claims " the Dark Lady" was sent to kill him. He is rescued by a few men, one of which is a demon named Assu, who has the power to burn things. He craves cold, so John takes him back to the mortuary’s freezer. There, a fire ignites and Assu is disintegrated into demonic black sludge. John tries to clean it all up, worried that if it is discovered, the FBI will track him down. With this in mind, he takes extra precautions, including arming the mortuary doors with motion detectors and finding a new place to stay.

The mortuary receives the body of the burned boy, and John finds two confounding hand prints on his arms that were left unscathed. Further contributing to his confusion, another drowned body is found at a junkyard out in the desert, with strange splash marks nearby. Then, Agent Mills of the FBI shows up in Lewisville. Immediately he inspects the mortuary and finds some of the black sludge left behind from the fire. Knowing that Mills will trace this evidence back to him, John runs out of town along the highway; but before he can escape, the same homeless-looking woman from the funeral attacks him. She flees when a car shows up, and John climbs inside before he realizes the driver is Mills. Exhausted from being attacked, John gives in and resigns himself to being in the custody of the FBI. Once they arrive at Mills’ motel, they find the dead body of a fellow agent displayed in the room. Then, Mills – whose actual name is Sam Harris – is taken over by the Dark Lady. He attacks the only other remaining FBI agent in Lewisville, but John manages to knock him out with a shower rod before any more damage can be done. Then, he immediately goes to tell his friends at the mortuary of the impending danger, but upon arrival learns that Margo is the Dark Lady. Thousands of years ago, she gave up her unborn child to become a "goddess," and ever since, she has used her powers to take care of young wayward souls, trying to make up for her loss. The Dark Lady tells John that there are only three Withered left, and that she is trying to create more to keep their legacy intact. John thinks about something Jasmyn once said – that everyone is worth saving – and tries to help the Withered by telling them the rules he put in place for himself to control his dangerous impulses. Realizing just how much he has changed himself, he exhorts them to follow a similar path and curb their lust for blood.

The FBI come, and a terrible array of violence breaks out. The homeless woman shows up and uses her powers to drown multiple agents, as well as another Withered that attacks John. Margo reveals that she turned this woman, Dana, into a demon sixty years ago as part of her plan to create more monsters. Because of her misery and desire to end the cycle of killing, Dana then drowns herself. Once Margo is the only Withered left, John convinces Agent Harris to let him stay with her to keep her in check; this way, a government execution will not be in her future. Five months later, John remains in Lewisville with Margo, helping her contain her darker side as well as continuing to improve himself. One day, Harris shows up with Margaret and Lauren, John’s aunt and sister, respectively. John’s story ends with him befriending the demon queen and a tearful, joyful reunion with the only family he has left.

Reception 
Rick Feldschau reviewed the book for Deseret News, writing that the conclusion "felt a bit far-fetched and saccharine" but concluded that "Dan Wells' latest comes in as one of the greats in the Cleaver series, paralleled only by book five's emotional depth and book one's intro to readers' favorite sociopath." Alternative Magazine Online reviewer Marty Mulrooney wrote that "Nothing Left to Lose takes all the atypical ingredients that have made the series so devilishly enjoyable and mixes them together in exciting new ways," and stated that while the ending "stretches believability," but that it was "worth it". Elitist Book Reviews also rated Nothing Left as a worthy conclusion for the series, recommending the novel's "twisty villains, twistier plots, and ... main character with (a knife and) all the heart in the world" to readers. At the Barnes and Nobel Science Fiction and Fantasy blog, Adam Rowe wrote that he the story was  "streamlined" and "gripping," "filled with the horrifying, murderous fun his fans rely on."

Awards and nominations 

 2017 AML Award nominee for Best Novel
 2017 Dragon Award nominee for Best Horror Novel

References

External links 

 Author's website
 Dan Wells literary manuscripts at L. Tom Perry Special Collections, Harold B. Lee Library, Brigham Young University

2017 American novels
American horror novels
Tor Books books
Novels set in Arizona
Harold B. Lee Library-related 21st century articles